The New Zealand Dermatological Society is a not-for-profit incorporated society for dermatologists in New Zealand. Its website for public education was started in 1996.

References

External links
 http://www.nzdsi.org

Dermatology organizations
Medical associations based in New Zealand